"Eyes Wide Open" is a song by the Belgian-Australian musician Gotye from his third studio album Making Mirrors. It was released as a digital download on 5 November 2010 in Australia and 4 June 2012 in the United States and United Kingdom. The song was written and produced by Gotye. It peaked at No. 55 on the Australian Singles Chart and was voted in at No. 25 in the 2010 Triple J Hottest 100.

The song features the Winton Musical Fence, a large fence with metal strings. Gotye sampled the Musical Fence in 2008 during a stay in Winton, Queensland.

In 2018, Broods released "Eyes a Mess", a cover medley of "Eyes Wide Open" and "Hearts a Mess".

Music video
A music video to accompany the release of "Eyes Wide Open" was first released onto YouTube on 25 October 2010 at a total length of three minutes and seventeen seconds. The music video was created by Sydney production company pictureDRIFT and directed by Brendan Cook. It features stop-motion animation created by Darcy Prenderghast of creatures riding on spider-legged boats over several barren terrains, searching for water. Perhaps due to the lack of water, their faces crumble. Underneath, we see Gotye's face as he sings the song but the face gets hidden away due to the use of water. The singer's face is also shown when the creatures project it in holograms through their eyes.

Track listing
Digital download
 "Eyes Wide Open" – 3:07

10" vinyl
 "Atimot ot Edo"
 "Eyes Wide Open"
 "Smoke and Mirrors"
 "Eyes Wide Open" (PVT Remix)

Personnel
Wally De Backer – lead & backing vocals, drums, Winton Musical Fence, piano, sampled sounds
Gareth Skinner – cellos
Lucas Taranto – bass guitar
Michael Hubbard – pedal steel guitar

Chart performance

Radio and release history

References

2010 singles
Gotye songs
Songs written by Gotye
2010 songs
Eleven: A Music Company singles